TB-21007 is a nootropic drug which acts as a subtype-selective inverse agonist at the α5 containing GABAA receptors.

See also 
 GABAA receptor negative allosteric modulator
 GABAA receptor § Ligands

References 

Primary alcohols
Benzo(c)thiophenes
GABAA receptor negative allosteric modulators
Ketones
Nootropics
2-Thiazolyl compounds
Thioethers